The 1975 Fiesta Bowl was the fifth edition of the college football bowl game, played at Sun Devil Stadium in Tempe, Arizona on Friday, December 26. Part of the 1975–76 bowl game season, it matched the sixth-ranked Nebraska Cornhuskers of the Big Eight Conference and the undefeated #7 Arizona State Sun Devils of the Western Athletic Conference (WAC). The underdog Sun Devils won, 17–14.

Played at ASU's home venue, this was the Fiesta Bowl's first matchup between teams ranked in the top ten; the next was six years later.

Teams

Nebraska

The Cornhuskers won their first ten games of the season and climbed to second in the AP poll; they were set up for a Big Eight title and potential national championship until a fourth consecutive loss to rival Oklahoma on November 22. This was Nebraska's first appearance in the Fiesta Bowl; the Huskers had won their previous six bowl games, and the last five were major bowls.

Arizona State

The Sun Devils won all eleven games in the regular season to take their fifth WAC title in six years; it was their fourth Fiesta Bowl appearance in five years.

Game summary
The game kicked off shortly after 1 p.m. MST, following the Sun Bowl, both televised by  CBS.

Placekicker Danny Kush started and ended the scoring in this game that arguably put the Fiesta Bowl on the map. He gave ASU an early lead in the first quarter, but I-back Monte Anthony gave Nebraska the lead in the second quarter with his one-yard touchdown run. With less than a minute remaining in the half, the Sun Devils drove down the field and narrowed the lead to a point with another Kush field goal.

Anthony scored another touchdown in the third quarter to extend Nebraska's lead to  Wide receiver John Jefferson caught a ten-yard touchdown pass from backup quarterback Fred Mortensen, who had taken over after sophomore starter Dennis Sproul was briefly hurt on a successful sneak on fourth down at the Nebraska thirteen to extend the drive. Head coach Frank Kush opted for a two-point conversion attempt, and wingback Larry Mucker caught a pass from Mortensen at the end zone's left edge to tie the game at fourteen early in the final quarter.

Nebraska punted twice after short drives, with Mortensen throwing an interception in between. Sproul returned at quarterback and he drove the Sun Devils down the field to the Nebraska twelve; Kush kicked a 29-yard field goal for a three-point lead with under five minutes remaining. The Huskers then got their offense going, and with just over a minute remaining, fullback Tony Davis caught a third-down pass over the middle inside the Devils' thirty. He was hit by John Harris and fumbled, ASU's Rocky Mataalli recovered, and the offense ran out the clock.

Arizona State held Nebraska scoreless in the fourth quarter to win their fourth Fiesta Bowl in as many attempts; Jefferson was named offensive MVP with eight receptions for 115 yards. Linebacker Larry Gordon was the defensive MVP, but was ejected early in the fourth quarter for fighting (along with Nebraska's consensus All-American center Rik Bonness). Nebraska led in rushing yards, but ASU outgained them in passing and total yards, had fewer turnovers, and scored just one touchdown.

Scoring
First quarter
 ASU – Danny Kush 27-yard field goal
Second quarter
 NEB – Monte Anthony 1-yard run (Mike Coyle kick)
 ASU – Kush 33-yard field goal
Third quarter
 NEB – Anthony 4-yard run (Coyle kick)
Fourth quarter
 ASU – John Jefferson 10-yard pass from Fred Mortensen (Larry Mucker pass from Mortensen)
 ASU – Kush 29-yard field goal

Statistics
{| class=wikitable style="text-align:center"
! Statistics !!   Arizona  State  !! Nebraska
|-
|align=left|First downs || 20|| 20
|-
|align=left|Rushes–yards|| 37–162|| 57–198
|-
|align=left|Passing yards|| 173|| 90
|-
|align=left|Passes|| 15–37–2|| 12–23–1
|-
|align=left|Return yards || 0|| 20
|-
|align=left|Total offense || 74–335|| 80–288
|-
|align=left|Punts–average ||5–37.2|| 7–39.4
|-
|align=left|Fumbles–lost ||0–0|| 2–2
|-
|align=left|Turnovers|| 2|| 3
|-
| Penalties–yards ||6–54|| 4–38
|}

Aftermath
Arizona State (12–0) was second in the final AP poll, their best finish ever; Nebraska (10–2) dropped to ninth. Both teams returned multiple times to the Fiesta Bowl, Nebraska five times (next in January 1986) and ASU twice (next in December 1977).

References

External links
 Fiesta Bowl – December 26, 1975
 YouTube – 1975 Fiesta Bowl – brief highlights

Fiesta Bowl
Fiesta Bowl
Arizona State Sun Devils football bowl games
Nebraska Cornhuskers football bowl games
December 1975 sports events in the United States
Fiesta Bowl